École Française Internationale de Khartoum (EFIK) is a French international school in Garden City, Khartoum, Sudan. The school was established in 1980 as the École Française de Khartoum and received its current name in 2014. It serves from preschool through the third-to-last year of education. As of 2015 it has not yet established its lycée (senior high school) programme.

References

External links

 École Française Internationale de Khartoum 

Khartoum
Schools in Khartoum
International schools in Sudan
1980 establishments in Sudan
Educational institutions established in 1980